Jean-Michel Damase (27 January 1928 – 21 April 2013) was a French pianist, conductor and composer of classical music.

Career
Damase was born in Bordeaux, the son of harpist Micheline Kahn. He was studying piano and solfège with Marcel Samuel-Rousseau at the age of five and composing by age nine.  His first work (at the age of nine) was a setting of some poems by Colette, whom he had met at a Parisian salon. In 1940, Damase began studying studying piano with Alfred Cortot at the École Normale de Musique. The next year, he was admitted to the Conservatoire de Paris, entering Armand Ferté’s piano classes and winning first prize for piano in 1943, afterwards studying with Henri Büsser, Marcel Dupré and Claude Delvincourt for composition and winning first prize for composition in 1947 for his Quintet for flute, harp, violin, viola, and cello. In the same year, he won the Grand Prix de Rome for his cantata Et la belle se réveilla. Meanwhile, he appeared as a piano soloist in the Colonne and Conservatoire concerts, and with the Orchestre National of the ORTF.  

He made the first complete recording of Gabriel Fauré's nocturnes and barcarolles, for which he received the Grand Prix du Disque.

Selected compositions
Orchestral
Symphony (1952)
Serenade for strings (1959)

Orchestrations
La fille mal gardée (1985) (of Peter Hertel's 1864 ballet score) 

Concertante
Concerto for harpsichord or harp and small orchestra (1984)
Concerto for viola, harp and string orchestra (1990)

Chamber music
Trio for flute, cello and harp (1947)
Trio for flute, viola and harp (1947)
Quintet for flute, harp and string trio, op. 2 (1948)
Aria for cello (or viola, or alto saxophone) and piano, op. 7 (1949)
17 variations for wind quintet, op. 22 (1951)
Sonate en concert for flute, piano and cello (ad libitum), op. 17 (1952)
Trio for flute, oboe and piano (1961)
String Trio (1965)
Sonata for clarinet and harp (1984)
Vacances for alto saxophone and piano (1990)
 Intermède for viola and piano (1990)
 Épigraphe for viola and piano (1991)
 Ostinato for viola and piano (1991)
 Prélude, élégie et final for bass trombone (or tuba) and piano (1993)
Trio for oboe, horn, and piano (1993)
Trio for two flutes and piano (1997)
Sonata for cello and harp (2002)
Hallucinations for viola and harp
Berceuse for horn and piano
Pavane variée for horn and piano

Operas
La tendre Eléonore (1958, premiered 1962 Marseilles, libretto L. Masson)
Colombe (1958, premiered 1961 Bordeaux, libretto Jean Anouilh with Maria Murano)
Eugène le mystérieux (1963, premiered 1964 Paris, libretto Marcel Achard after Eugène Sue)
Le matin de Faust (1965, premiered 1966 Nice, libretto Y. Gautier and F. Dereyne)
Madame de ... (1969, premiered 1970 Monte Carlo, libretto Jean Anouilh after L. de Vilmorin)
Eurydice (1972, premiered 1972 Bordeaux, libretto Jean Anouilh)
L'héritière (1974, premiered 1974 Nancy, libretto L. Durcreux after adaptation by R. and A. Goetz of H. James: Washington Square)

Film scores
Term of Trial (1962)

References

Sources
Greene, David Mason (1985). . Reproducing Piano Roll Fnd. page 1512. .

1928 births
2013 deaths
20th-century classical composers
20th-century French male classical pianists
20th-century French composers
20th-century French conductors (music)
21st-century classical composers
21st-century French composers
21st-century French male musicians
Academic staff of the École Normale de Musique de Paris
Conservatoire de Paris alumni
French ballet composers
French male classical composers
French male conductors (music)
French opera composers
Male opera composers
Musicians from Bordeaux
Prix de Rome for composition
Composers for harp